Wallace Bernard Borrevik (November 14, 1921 – December 9, 1988) was an American professional basketball player. He played in the National Basketball League for the Anderson Duffey Packers, Flint Dow A.C.'s, and Tri-Cities Blackhawks during the 1947–48 season.

References

1921 births
1988 deaths
All-American college men's basketball players
American men's basketball players
Anderson Packers players
Basketball players from Oregon
Centers (basketball)
Flint Dow A.C.'s players
Oregon Ducks men's basketball players
People from Reedsport, Oregon

People from Silverton, Oregon
Tri-Cities Blackhawks players